The 1894 Rush Medical football team was an American football team that represented Rush Medical College in the 1894 college football season.

Schedule

Roster

Rosters for the Lake Forest and Englewood High School games are unknown.

References

Rush Medical
 Rush Medical College football seasons
Rush Medical football